A los 40 is a 2014 Peruvian comedy film written and directed by Bruno Ascenzo. Starring Carlos Alcántara Vilar, Carlos Carlín, Katia Condos, Lali Espósito, Gianella Neyra, Wendy Ramos, Sofía Rocha, Stefano Salvini and Johanna San MiguelAndrés Wiese

Synopsis 
Eight characters in their 40s face their past, present and future at a prom reunion party that leads them to question where their lives are headed.

Production 
The film was announced with a teaser on September 25, 2013. On November 12 of the same year, filming began in Lima. The comedians from Patacláun Carlos Alcántara, Carlos Carlín, Johanna San Miguel and Wendy Ramos were present.

Cast 
The actors participating in this film are:

 Carlos Alcántara as Luis Miguel Corrales.
 Carlos Carlín as Eddy Montalvo.
 Katia Condos as Francesca.
 Lali Esposito as Melissa.
 Gianella Neyra as Sofia.
 Andrés Wiese as Alejandro.
 Wendy Ramos as Lourdes Flores.
 Johanna San Miguel as Julia Dueñas.
 Sofía Rocha as Bárbara Martínez.
 Stefano Salvini as Mariano.
 Patricia Portocarrero as Anita Montalvo.
 Salvador del Solar as Esteban.

Reception

Box-office 
On May 1 it was released in Peru. Just 8 days after its premiere, the film exceeded 400 thousand viewers. In its entirety, it reached more than a million and a half viewers, generating a profit of 6 million, and obtaining the record of being the second highest-grossing film in the history of Peruvian cinema, as well as being the highest grosser in 2014.

References

External links 

 

2014 films
2014 comedy films
Peruvian comedy films
Tondero Producciones films
2010s Peruvian films
2010s Spanish-language films
Films set in Peru
Films shot in Peru
Films about friendship